Kazimierz Kordylewski (born 11 October 1903 in Poznań – 11 March 1981 in Kraków, Poland) was a Polish astronomer.

In 1956, he claimed the discovery of the Kordylewski clouds, large transient concentrations of dust at the Trojan points of the Earth–Moon system, which were reported to have been confirmed to exist in October 2018.

He studied at University of Poznań and Jagiellonian University, and earned a PhD degree in 1932.

References

External links
 A page about Kazimierz Kordylewski. Archived on 26 January 2005.

1903 births
1981 deaths
20th-century Polish astronomers
Discoverers of moons
Jagiellonian University alumni
Scientists from Poznań
Scientists from Kraków
Burials at Rakowicki Cemetery